Kullar Viimne (born 22 March 1980 in Võru) is an Estonian director, scriptwriter, editor and cinematographer.

Between 2004 - 2011 he studied at the Baltic Film and Media School of Cinema, Tallinn University. Has furthered his education at film school FAMU (Czech Republic) and IAD (Belgium).

He is a member of the Estonian Filmmakers' Union, the Estonian Audio Visual Arts Union and the Estonian Union of Journalists.

Filmography

A director 
 Kuidas ma Aafrikat päästsin (2014)
 Jahis ainult naised(2012)
 Hing (2011)
 Ultra Vennikased (2009) 
 Süütu (kaasautor, 2009) 
 Viimnepäev (2006) 
 Reis kerge pagasiga (2006) 
 Jumalaga (2004) 
 Kuhu lähed? (2003)

Cinematographer 
 "Poissmees ja Volga" (dir. Aljona Surzhikova, 2014) *"Elizabethi mänguväljak" (dir. Maris Kerge ja Erik Norkroos, 2014)
 "Kiirtee kordnik" (dir. Meelis Süld ja Meelis Muhu, 2014)
 "Lained ja võnked" (dir. Marianne Kõrver ja Kaido Veermäe, 2014)
 "Kuidas ma Aafrikat päästsin" (dir. Kullar Viimne, 2014)
 "Velosoofid" (dir. Jaan Tootsen, 2013)
 "Veregrupp" (dir. Leeni Linna, 2013)
 "Jahis ainult naised" (dir. Kullar Viimne, 2012) 
 "Sinine Kõrb" (dir. Ruti Murusalu, 2012) 
 "Sünnipäev" (dir. Erik Norkroos, 2012)
 "Üleloetud inimesed" (dir. Meelis Muhu, 2012)
 "Hing" (2011) (dir. Kullar Viimne, 2011)
 "The New World" (dir. Jaan Tootsen, 2011)
 "Et meeldiks kõigile" (dir. Kristina Norman, 2011) 
 "Päikeselill" (dir. Jaanis Valk, 2011) 
 "Roots – sada aastat sõda ja muusikat" (dir. Katrin Laur, 2011)
 "Kalevite kanged pojad" (dir. Valentin Kuik, 2010)
 "Tsirkusetuur" (dir. Jaak Kilmi, 2010)
 "Moekoer" (dir. Moonika Siimets, 2010)
 "Üleriigiline õnn" (dir. Anne-Mari Neider, 2010) 
 "Ultra Vennikased" (dir. Kullar Viimne, 2009)
 "Sõnumitooja" (dir. Leeni Linna, 2009)
 "Süütu" (dir. Sophie Haarhaus ja Kullar Viimne, 2009)
 "Kihnu pulm" (dir. Meelis Muhu, 2009)
 "Kiri Ruhnust" (dir. Heilika Pikkov, 2009)
 "Vabadus algab seest" (dir. Kai-Mai Olbri, 2009) 
 "" (dir. Meelis Muhu, 2009) 
 "Aja meistrid" (dir. Mait Laas, 2008) 
 "Viimnepäev" (dir. Kullar Viimne, 2006)
 "Reis kerge pagasiga" (dir. Kullar Viimne, 2006) 
 "Täkutallinn" (dir. Marianne Ostrat, 2006) 
 "Jumalaga" (dir. Kullar Viimne, 2004)
 "Kuhu lähed?" (dir. Kullar Viimne, 2003)

Acknowledgements 
 Estonian Cultural Endowment Scholarship "Live and Shine" (2011)
 IX Estonian Film Days, the best Estonian documentary film "Travelling Light" (in 2007)
 XIX Pärnu Film Festival in the best Estonian documentary film "God" for the (2005)
 Estonian Cultural Endowment, a young filmmaker Scholarship (2004)
 Estonian Film Foundation, the young filmmaker Scholarship (2002)

External links
 Tiit Tuumalu "Viimse tund on tulnud". Postimees, 02. November 2014
 Peeter Vihma "Aafrika päästmise võimalikkusest". Sirp, 31. oktoober 2014
 Heilika Pikkov Persona Grata, Kullar Viimne, Teater.Muusika.Kino, April 2011
 

1980 births
Living people
Estonian film directors
Estonian cinematographers
Estonian screenwriters
People from Võru
Tallinn University alumni